Tanju Korel (10 October 1944 – 21 September 2005) was a Turkish actor and documentary director.

Life and career 
Tanju Korel was born on 10 October 1944 in Istanbul. After graduating from Galatasaray High School, he continued his education at the University of Grenoble. In 1966, he took part in an acting competition organized by Perde magazine, where he earned the first place together with the fellow actor Murat Soydan. He made his cinmeatic debut in the same year with a role in the movie Eşkiya. He also appeared in a number of TV series. In 1974, he married actress Hülya Darcan, with whom she had two daughters: Zeynep and Bergüzar. Korel also produced a number of documentaries throughout his career.

Death 
Korel died on 21 September 2005 after suffering from lung cancer. His remains were buried at the Zincirlikuyu Cemetery.

Filmography

Documentaries directed 
 Laiklik ve Laik Devlet Anlayışı
 Bitlis - 1990
 Kırşehir'in Dili - 1991
 Çanakkale Şehitleri ve Şehitlikleri
 Türk Sineması'nda Sansür ve Yasaklar

As producer 
 Kara Elmas - 1990

As actor

References

Further reading

External links 
 
 Profile at 

1944 births
2005 deaths
Turkish male film actors
Turkish male television actors
Deaths from lung cancer in Turkey
Burials at Zincirlikuyu Cemetery
Male actors from Istanbul
Galatasaray High School alumni
Turkish people of Circassian descent